Chloroclystis androgyna is a species of moth of the  family Geometridae. It is found in La Réunion.

References

Herbulot, Cl. 1957b. Lépidoptères Geometridae de l'île de la Réunion. - Mémoires de l'Institut scientifique de Madagascar (E)8(2):227–236, pl. 5.

Moths described in 1957
Chloroclystis
Moths of Réunion
Moths of Africa